Slovenian-style polka (also known as Cleveland Style polka) is an American style of polka in the Slovenian tradition. It is usually associated with Cleveland and other Midwestern cities.

Instruments
The Slovenian style polka band always includes a piano accordion, chromatic accordion, or the Diatonic button accordion (also called a "button box"). Sometimes an accordion called the Half Chromatic, often abbreviated half-chrom, is used. This accordion has a right side similar to a three-row B-system chromatic accordion, but a bass side similar to the Diatonic button accordion. Some bands in Slovenia use keyboard instead of accordion. The other melody instrument is a saxophone or clarinet, and the rhythm instruments include drums, bass, and guitar or banjo. Avsenik brothers add a trumpet, too. The Slovenian style polka in the United States of America came about when immigrants from Slovenia taught the old songs to their children. Those children, as adults, translated the old songs from Slovene into English, and arranged them in a polka beat. This began the oral tradition of Cleveland-style polka music.

History
At first Slovenian style polka was just music for ethnic clubs and union halls, but the commercial success of Frankie Yankovic (Jankovič) and other musicians soon introduced the genre to a wider audience. William Lausche incorporated the elements of classical music and early jazz at which point the style took on a type of swing that can be heard in his piano playing, even on some early Yankovic recordings. Johnny Pecon and Lou Trebar consequently extended the style to its farthest reaches harmonically, including blue notes, substitutions and compounded symbolism, elements of whole-tone scales, modality, borrowed and altered chords homophonically or in the implied or broken form and compounded and odd rhythmic embellishments or reductions, in addition to the use of structural and textural dynamics and phrasing that had up to that point never been utilized to such a degree.

In addition to Frankie Yankovic, the most important pioneers in developing this style of music include Matt Hoyer, Dr. William Lausche, Johnny Pecon, Lou Trebar, Johnny Vadnal, Eddie Habat, and Kenny Bass.

The music heard during scene transitions on The Drew Carey Show is played in Cleveland-style polka to suit the city it is set in.

Notable musicians
Other notable musicians include Willie Verant, Slavko Avsenik, Louis Bashell, Eddie Blazonczyk, Tom Brusky, Louis Spehek, The Chardon Polka Band, Frankie Mullec, Georgie Cook, Joe Kusar, Pete Sokach, Bob Timko, Eddie Platt, Lou Sadar, Paul Yanchar, Mirk Yama, Jim Medves, Adolph Srnick, Johnny Kafer, Tony Vadnal, Richie Vadnal, Frankie Vadnal, Joe Stradiot, Bill Srnick, Frank Mahnic, Verne Meisner, Steve Meisner, Frankie Zeitz, Eddie Adamic, The Polka Maestre-Canada, Joe Luzar, Lou Luzar, Ray Champa, Eddie Bucar, Al Tercek, Walter Ostanek, Dick Flaisman, Frankie Kramer, Louie Bajc, Joe Sodja (banjoist), Dick Sodja, Al Markic, Eddie Kenik, Chester Budny, Jake Zagger, Frankie Spetich, Johnny Spetich, Dwight Gobely, George Staiduhar, Cecilia Dolgan, Art Perko, Jeff Pecon, Johnny Pecon Jr., Ralph Delligatti, Joey Miskulin, Willie Strah, Dave Wolnik, Eddie Rodick, Don Wojtila, Dan Wojtila, Dave Skrajner, Al Bambic, Jerry Suhar, Bob Kravos, Norm Kobal, John Gerl, Denny Bucar, Frank Okicki, Ron Sluga, Jack Ponikvar, Marty Sintic, Mark Habat, Wayne Habat, Stan Blout, Joe Fedorchak, Bob Bacha, Gaylord Klancnik, Ed Klancnik, Kim Rodick, Terry Skovenski, Phil Srnick, Eddie Rodick III, Frank Yasnowski, Fred Yasnowski, Joe Zdelar, Logan Watson, Frankie Spetich Jr., Fred Kuhar, Pete Kuhar, Dave Wretschko, Mikey Dee, Bill Metts, Jerry Zagar, Lou Hribar, Benzy Rathbone, Bruce Burger, Johnny Borish, Marge Ford, Fred Ziwich, Bob Zolka, Joey Tomsick, Kathy Hlad, Eric Noltkamper, Hank Guzel, Jr., Joe Grkman, Dick Tady, Jack Tady, Brian O'Boyle, Sam Pugliano, Fred Gregorich, Mary Udovich, Josephine Lausche, Anna Vadnal, Frenchy (Frank) Sintic -Sunshine Boys, Jerry "Jazz" Jasinski, LynnMarie Hrovat, Larry Sintic, Frank Svet, Ron Pivovar, and many others.

See also
 Polka Hall of Fame
 International Polka Association
 Music of Slovenia

External links 
 International Polka Association
 Cleveland Style Polka Hall of Fame
 Slovenian & Cleveland style polkas - hundreds of pages with information, photos, articles and music related to Slovenian polka music

Polka genres
American styles of music
Slovenian folk music
Slovene-American history
Culture of Cleveland